The Countess of Huntingdon's Connexion is a small society of evangelical churches, founded in 1783 by Selina Hastings, Countess of Huntingdon, as a result of the Evangelical Revival. For many years it was strongly associated with the Calvinist Methodist movement of George Whitefield.

History

The Countess of Huntingdon's Connexion was founded in 1783 by Selina Hastings, Countess of Huntingdon, as a result of the Evangelical Revival. It seceded from the Church of England, founded its own training establishment – Trevecca College – and built up a network of chapels across England in the late 18th century.

In 1785 John Marrant (1755–1791), an African American from New York and the South who settled in London after the American Revolutionary War, became ordained as a minister with the Connexion. He was supported in travel to Nova Scotia as a missionary to minister to the Black Loyalists who had been resettled there by the Crown. Many of the members of the congregation which he organized in Birchtown, Nova Scotia later chose to emigrate and resettle in Sierra Leone, the new British colony in West Africa. What was called a Province of Freedom was founded in 1792. Additional Connexion churches were founded in Sierra Leone (see below), and the British and Sierra Leone movements re-established contact in 1839.

The Connexion had earlier efforts at congregation building in Canada. In the 1850s, the entrepreneur Thomas Molson built a church for the Connexion group near his brewery in Montreal. It was poorly attended as the city's population was predominantly Catholic. The building was adapted for use as a military barracks. 

The Connexion gave strong support to the Calvinistic Methodist movement in Wales in the 18th and early 19th centuries, including the foundation of a theological college at Trefeca in 1760.

Churches

Active
Today the Connexion has 22 congregations in England and "more than 30" in Sierra Leone. A UK-registered charity provides financial help with ministers' wages and training and for Connexion schools and teaching salaries in the latter country. 

Of the UK churches, seven normally have full-time pastors: Eastbourne, Ely, Goring, Rosedale, St. Ives, Turners Hill and Ebley. Total regular attendance at all churches is approximately 1,000 adults and children.

Earlier churches
Connexion churches were formerly active in:
Bath, Somerset:  founded in 1765, later Trinity United Reformed Church and now the Museum of Bath Architecture
Bodmin, Cornwall: in January 1880 the congregation bought the "very desirable" property known as Springfield for a minister's residence.
Brighton, East Sussex, the first of the churches, was founded at North Street in 1761.
East Grinstead, West Sussex: Zion Chapel founded in 1810, now the West Street Baptist Church
Cheltenham, Gloucestershire Portland Chapel, North Place was built at the expense of Robert Capper in 1816 for a Connexion congregation. It was later joined by and then merged with a Baptist Congregation from Golden Valley, Cheltenham. 
Fordham, Essex was active in the 19th century.
Preston, Lancashire, founded before 1826, in Pole Street, is now closed.
South Stoke, Oxfordshire, founded in 1820, is now a private house.
Steyning, West Sussex: Jarvis Hall, a Connexion church from 1835 to 1841
St John's Free Church, Westcott, Surrey remains as a community centre.
Tyldesley, Greater Manchester, founded in 1789, known as Tyldesley Top Chapel, now belongs to a Pentecostal congregation.
Worcester, Worcestershire had closed as a chapel by 1970. It is now a concert hall known as Huntingdon Hall.
York Street, Dublin, built in 1808

References

External links

Countess of Huntingdon's Connexion – official website
Countess of Huntingdon Connexion History – South Street Free Evangelical Church
New Connexions– New Connexions Group of Churches
G.W. Kirby (1972), The Elect Lady

 
1783 establishments in England
History of Christianity in the United Kingdom
Methodism in England
Reformed denominations in Europe
Calvinistic Methodism
Religious organizations established in 1783
Evangelical denominations in Europe
Methodist denominations established in the 18th century
Evangelical denominations established in the 18th century